Harpagidia is a genus of moths in the family Gelechiidae.

Species
Harpagidia acanthopis (Meyrick, 1932)
Harpagidia amplexa (Meyrick, 1925)
Harpagidia magnetella (Staudinger, 1871)
Harpagidia mauricaudella (Oberthür, 1888)

References

Dichomeridinae